Sandyville is an unincorporated community in northern Sandy Township, Tuscarawas County, Ohio, United States.  It has a post office with the ZIP code 44671.  It lies along State Route 800 between Canton and New Philadelphia.

Among the notable residents of Sandyville was Graydon Evans, a World War II test pilot who was killed in the crash of an experimental airplane in 1943. Another notable resident of Sandyville was Joseph R. Antenora who was the Executive Director and later the first Commissioner of The Professional Bowlers Association (PBA) and the Professional Bowler's Tour.

History
Sandyville was laid out and platted in 1815. The community takes its name from nearby Sandy Creek. A post office called Sandyville has been in operation since 1816. The village was originally located a half-mile south next to Sandy Creek, but decided to move to its present site in the 1930s after the Muskingum Watershed Conservancy District announced plans to build a series of dams in the region that would have put the town inside a flood plain. About 30 homes, the town hall, post office and several businesses were physically moved uphill to the new site between 1937 and 1938.

References

Unincorporated communities in Ohio
Unincorporated communities in Tuscarawas County, Ohio